"Too Many Times" was the third and final single to be released by Australian pop music duo Sister2Sister.

Track listings
Australian CD1
 "Too Many Times"
 "Too Many Times" (2 Step Radio Mix)
 "Too Many Times" (Get It Up Radio Mix)
 "My Baby"
 "What's a Girl to Do?" (Urban Mix)

Australian CD2
 "Too Many Times"
 "What's a Girl to Do?" (Live on The Panel)
 "Too Many Times" (2 Step radio mix)
 "What's a Girl to Do?" (Allmighty mix)
 "Too Many Times" (video)

Charts

Release history

References

2000 singles
Sister2Sister songs
2000 songs